Amrita Pratapsinh Shinde (born 9 July 1975) is an Indian former cricketer who played as an all-rounder, batting right-handed and bowling right-arm leg break. She appeared in one Test match and five One Day Internationals for India in 2002. She played domestic cricket for Maharashtra and Air India.

References

External links
 
 

1975 births
Living people
People from Kolhapur
Indian women cricketers
India women Test cricketers
India women One Day International cricketers
Maharashtra women cricketers
Air India women cricketers
West Zone women cricketers